Qarah Daraq-e Olya-ye Yek (also Romanized as Qarah Daraq-e ‘Olyā-ye Yek; also known asBāsh Qarah Darreh and Qarah Daraq-e ‘Olyā) is a village in Abish Ahmad Rural District, Abish Ahmad District, Kaleybar County, East Azerbaijan Province, Iran. At the 2006 census, its population was 51, in 12 families.

References 

Populated places in Kaleybar County